Des Campbell (born 19 January 1951) is a former Australian rules footballer who played with Melbourne in the Victorian Football League (VFL).

Notes

External links 

1951 births
Living people
Australian rules footballers from Victoria (Australia)
Melbourne Football Club players
Shepparton United Football Club players